Squilla is a genus of mantis shrimp. It includes the following species:

Squilla aculeata Bigelow, 1893
Squilla biformis Bigelow, 1891
Squilla bigelowi Schmitt, 1940
Squilla brasiliensis Calman, 1917
Squilla cadenati Manning, 1970
Squilla caribaea Manning, 1969
Squilla chydaea Manning, 1962
Squilla deceptrix Manning, 1969
Squilla discors Manning, 1962
Squilla edentata (Lunz, 1937)
Squilla empusa Say, 1818
Squilla grenadensis Manning, 1969
Squilla hancocki Schmitt, 1940
Squilla intermedia Bigelow, 1893
Squilla latreillei
Squilla lijdingi Holthuis, 1959
Squilla mantis (Linnaeus, 1758)
Squilla mantoidea Bigelow, 1893
Squilla obtusa Holthuis, 1959
Squilla panamensis Bigelow, 1891
Squilla parva Bigelow, 1891
Squilla rugosa Bigelow, 1893
Squilla surinamica Holthuis, 1959
Squilla tiburonensis Schmitt, 1940

References

Stomatopoda